Peter Leonhard (Pietro Leonardo) Gianelli (27 December 1767  23 December 1807) was a Danish medallist and sculptor. His most notable works include two models commemorating the Danish Abolition of the Slave Trade (1792) and the Battle of Copenhagen (1801), both of which were based on drawings by Nicolai Abraham Abildgaard..

Early life and education
Gianelli was born on 27 December 1767 in Copenhagen, the son of plasterer  Domenico Maria Gianelli (c. 1723-1801) and Johanna Eisen (1743-1812). His father had come to denmark in 1758 and was first time married to Maria Barbra (c. 1735-59).

Gianelli attended the Royal Danish Academy of Fine Arts from 1778 to 1791. He was initially trained as a sculpture, winning the small and large silver medals in 1784 and 1787 and finally the small gold medal in 1789. He then decided to specialize as a medallist. Nicolai Abraham Abildgaard saw to it that he was awarded the Academy's travel stipend in 1791 in spite of not having won its large gold medal. He spent the next five years abroad.

Career
On his return to Copenhagen in 1796, he was associated the Academy. In 1798, he was made a full member of the Academy after submitting a new stamp for the Academy's large silver medal as his membership piece. In 1800, he was engaged as medallist at the Royal Mint.

Gianelli's early works as a sculptor include a statue of Apollo (1787) and a relief of Cain and Abel (1789, competition work) as well as a number of portrait reliefs and busts.

As a medallist, he only created the stamps for nine medals. The most successful of them were based on drawings by Abildgaard. One of them was the Academys new large silver medal. Two of the others commemorated the abolition of the Trans-Atlantic slave trade (1792), and the Battle of Copenhagen (1801). The fourth was the Royal Danish Academy of Science and Letters' Price Medal. The portrait on a medal to Martin Vahl (died 1804) was also based on a drawing by Abildgaard. His other works include the stamps for a half speciedaler (1798) and spdr. (1799 and 1800) as well as kurantpengesedler and skatkammerbeviser.

Personal life
Gianelli  was on 8 March 1802 in Holmen Church married to Anna Margrethe Louise Boyesen (1778-1851), daughter of bailiff (byfoged) and kancelliråd Søren B. (1730-98) and Dorothea Sophie Bruun (1746-1831).

Gianelli  was in his youth friends with Bertel Thorvaldsen. They were both members of Borups Selskab, a private theatre society. His sister Christiane Juliane Frederikke Gianelli (1782-1816) was in 1807 narried to the miniature painter Christian Horneman. He died on 23 December 1807 and is buried in the Catholic section of Assistens Cemetery. His widow was subsewuently married to his brother Giovanni Domenico Gianelli , a plasterer.

List of works
 

Medals
 Danish Abolition of the Slave Trade Medal (1792)
 Medal commemorating the Battle of Copenhagen (1801)
Statues
 Apollo (1787)

Reliefs
 Kain and Abel (17789)
 H. W. v.Huth (1783, Frederiksborg Museum)
  Ove Høegh-Guldberg (1784, Frederiksborg Museum)

Busts
 Balth. Münter (1789, ]]Copenhagen University Library]])
 J. C. J. v.Berger (1791, Grederiksborg Museum)

References

External links

18th-century Danish medallists
19th-century Danish medallists
18th-century Danish sculptors
18th-century male artists
Artists from Copenhagen
Danish people of Italian descent
1767 births
1807 deaths